Güttenbach is a town in the district of Güssing in the Austrian state of Burgenland.

Population

Partner communities
 Malinska-Dubašnica, Croatia
 Szentpéterfa, Hungary

References

External links
 Güttenbach at Austria.at

Cities and towns in Güssing District